The individual championship test, grade IV, para-equestrian dressage event at the 2012 Summer Paralympics was contested on 2 September at Greenwich Park in London.

The competition was assessed by a ground jury composed of five judges placed at locations designated E, H, C, M, and B. Each judge rated the competitors' performances with a percentage score. The five scores from the jury were then averaged to determine a rider's total percentage score.

Ground jury

Results 

T = Team Member (see Equestrian at the 2012 Summer Paralympics – Team).

References 

 

Individual championship test grade 4